Kylie Collins and Robin Montgomery were the defending champions but Montgomery chose not to participate. 

Collins partnered alongside Ashlyn Krueger, but lost in the final to Kolie Allen and Ava Markham, 6–3, 1–6, [3–10].

Seeds

Draw

Draw

References

External Links
Main Draw

The Women's Hospital Classic - Doubles